HERO - Bhakti Hi Shakti Hai is an Indian superhero television series which aired on Hungama TV from 30 May 2005 to 9 August 2007. It is about the heroic deeds and adventures of a superhero called Hero, who is bestowed with out-of-this-world magical powers by the Goddess Durga to help him fight the criminals and supervillains. Created by Arif Ali of UTV and directed by Waseem Sabir and Imtiaz Alam. It stars Sumeet Pathak.

Overview
The story revolves around a boy named Joy, who is disliked by most of his schoolmates even his brother for his innocent and childish personality. Joy's mother and two of his friends, Meenu and Chhota Pape, are the only individuals who support him. One day, Joy and his family are attacked by some goons and he tries to save them. However, Joy's mother gets harmed and his brother begins hating him even more.

Due to all these bad things happening in his life, Joy goes to goddess Durga's temple to get help so that she can make him smart and intelligent like his brother. Due to his innocence and indomitable will, the goddess is impressed and gives him a magical ring through which he can transform himself into a superhero named "HERO". Goddess Durga also transforms his beloved toys Dholu and Babli into living beings but only for the time when Joy is in his Hero form. Here is the start of a new journey of Joy's life in which he saves the Earth from powerful supervillains like Virat, Samrat and many more.

Cast
Sumeet Pathak as Joy Sehgal/Hero (2005–2007)
Rupali Suri as Babli (2005)
Nirmal Soni as Dholu (2005)
Shilpa Tulaskar as Sunaina Sehgal (2005, 2007)
Beena Banerjee replaced Tulaskar as Sunaina (2006)
Mayank Tandon as Avi Sehgal (2005–2006)
Chetanya Adib as Veer Sehgal/Virat (2006)
Lavina Tandon as Charlotte (2005–2006)
Kishan Savjani as Raju "Rejji" Madan Saxena (2005–2006)
Dhairya Ojha as Chunky Nayyar (2005)
Rakesh Thareja as Prem Prakash Sharma (2005–2007)
Vijay Aidasani as Principal Karnal Raghavan (2005)
Rajeev Kumar as Varun Sir (2005)
Akshita Garuad as Menaakshi "Meenu" Desai (2005)
Parth Muni as Balvinder "Chotta Pape" Kulwinder Harnam Singh Sodhi (2005–2007)
Farida Jalal as Bebe (2005)
Pragati Mehra as Kirthar Maami (2005)
Addite Shirwaikar Malik as Miss Jasmine (2005)
Gaurav Gera as Cameraman Flash (2005)
Abbas Ali as Goga/Zipzap (2005, 2006)
Anuj Pandit Sharma as Invisible boy Sadashiv (2005)
Renuka Bondre as Manorma
Chahatt Khanna as Princess Myra (2005)
Amano Dhyan as Bubble Badashah (2006)
Amit K Sinha as Chumbak Choo (2006)
Shahid Hassan as Gappi (2006)
Kavi Kumar Azad as Dhappi (2006)
Akanksha Kapil as Shruti Singh (2006)
Shridhar Watsar as Gabbar (2006)
Vijay Ganju as Cactus Cola (2006)
Jagesh Mukati as Caiptan Cooker (2006)
Narendra Bedi as Changa Mama (2006)
Bijal Batavia as Sharmila Miss (2007)
Shivansh as Honey (2007)
Adityansh as Bankey "BB" Babu (2007)
Shivshakti Sachdev as Neetu Shrivastava (2007)
Sushil Parashar as Dr. Darr/Masoom Sir (2007)
Farzil Pardiwalla as Harry's Dad (2007)
Sachin Nayak as Umbrella Man (2007)
Daniyal Hassan as Harry "Harry The Rockstar" Podar (2007)

Episode list

Series overview

Season 1 (2005)

Season 2 (2006)

Season 3 (2007)

Broadcast
The series aired from 30 May 2005 to 9 August 2007 on Hungama TV and ran for 3 seasons and 168 episodes. Reruns of the series also aired on Jetix, Disney XD and Bindass.

References

External links

2005 Indian television series debuts
2007 Indian television series endings
Indian drama television series
Indian superhero television shows
Hungama TV original programming
UTV Television
Indian fantasy television series
Jetix original programming
Disney XD (Indian TV channel) original programming
Indian action television series